Cabo da Roca or Cape Roca is a cape which forms the westernmost point of the Sintra Mountain Range, of mainland Portugal, of continental Europe, and of the Eurasian landmass. It is situated in the municipality of Sintra, near Azóia, in the southwest of the district of Lisbon. Notably the point includes a lighthouse that started operation in 1772.

History
Cabo da Roca was known to the Romans as Promontorium Magnum and during the Age of Sail as the Rock of Lisbon.

Lighthouse

Geography

The cape is within the Sintra-Cascais Natural Park, 42 kilometres west of the city of Lisbon and in the southwest of Sintra. A location is inscribed on a stone plaque, located on a monument at the site.

The western coast is a mixture of sandy beaches and rocky cliff promontories: around Cabo da Roca, cliffs are more than 100 metres in height, and cut into crystalline rocks, composed of strongly folded and faulted sedimentary units. These forms are disturbed by dikes and small beaches. This promontory of "high" beaches is the extreme western immersion of the ancient eruptive Sintra massif, as evident from the rose-coloured granite in the north and syenite of the Ribeira do Louriçal in the south. In the vicinity of the Cape, there are geomorphological examples of gabbro-diorite, volcanic breccia, and granite.

Part of the granite formations show evidence of strong coastal erosion, while in other areas there are limestone deposits embedded in the granite.

Much of the vegetation on this cape is low-lying and adapted to saltwater and windy conditions. Once home to a variety of plant life, Cabo da Roca has been overrun with the invasive plant species Carpobrotus edulis. This creeping, mat-forming plant, a member of the Aizoaceae succulent family, was introduced as ground cover by local residents several decades ago, but now covers much of the arable land on Cabo da Roca.

Many migratory and marine birds roost temporarily along the cliffs and protected coves of the coastal area.

Climate
The climate present at Cape Roca is extremely moderated by the ocean. Due to seasonal upwelling, the area comprising the cape has cool, stable summers with little to no rainfall but very common occurrences of fog which boosts the humidity and decreases insolation. On the other hand, winters are rainy and have mild temperatures especially during the night, though the amount of precipitation received in this season is unparalleled with other places nearby such as the Sintra Mountains which can receive triple that precipitation. Due to the seasonal lag, September is the warmest month.

See also
 Extreme points of Europe
 Cape Finisterre
 Pointe de Corsen
 Cape Nordkinn
 Land's End

External links
 Panoramic view of Cabo da Roca

References

Notes

Sources
 
 

Roca
Extreme points of Earth
Extreme points of Portugal
Geography of Lisbon District
Roca
Sintra